Kristhielee Yinaira Caride Santiago also known as Kristhielee Caride (born 8 July 1991) is a Puerto Rican actress, teacher, athlete, model and beauty pageant titleholder who won the title of Miss Puerto Rico Universe 2016.

Caride was appointed to represent Puerto Rico at Miss Universe 2016, until she was dethroned from the title. The decision was effective on 17 March  2016 by the Miss Universe Puerto Rico Organization. Caride challenged the decision in the Puerto Rico court, which ruled against her on 13 September 2016.

Career
Caride was born in Bayamón, Puerto Rico and earned a bachelor's degree from the University of Puerto Rico (Río Piedras Campus) majoring in Theater Education and Drama.

Pageantry

Miss Universe Puerto Rico
Kristhielee competed in the Miss Universe Puerto Rico 2014 pageant representing the municipality of Dorado where she earned a placement as one of the Top 16 finalist. Caride later competed in Miss Universe Puerto Rico 2016 representing the municipality of Isabela where she won the pageant.

Dethronement
On 17 March 2016, Desiree Lowry announced on national television that Caride had been stripped of her title after a controversial interview between Caride and Venezuelan entertainment reporter Patricia Vargas. According to the Miss Universe Puerto Rico Organization, the reason of her dismissal was that she was both rude and arrogant to a journalist during a televised interview, refusing to participate on camera.

Caride later wrote a public letter apologizing to the journalist and explained to the organization she had been going through personal problems and was having a difficult day. Shortly afterwards, Lowry and the organization's franchise owner Luisito Vigoreaux issued a press release claiming that because Caride was not fulfilling her contractual obligations as Miss Universe Puerto Rico 2016 by missing multiple public appearances she would be replaced by Miss Universe Puerto Rico 2016 first runner-up Brenda Jiménez.

On 13 September 2016, the Puerto Rican court announced its decision ruling against Caride and her claim to the crown and title. Her crown and title were forfeited and awarded to first runner up Brenda Jiménez of Aguadilla to represent at Miss Universe 2016.

References

Living people
Puerto Rican beauty pageant winners
1991 births
People from Bayamón, Puerto Rico